Fisher House, or variations including Fisher Hall or Fisher Homestead, may refer to:

Fisher House Foundation - an organization funding the construction of family lodging facilities near military hospitals

in England
Fisher House, Cambridge - the Catholic Chaplaincy to the University of Cambridge

in the United States
(by state then city)
Fisher Memorial Home, Casa Grande, Arizona, listed on the National Register of Historic Places (NRHP)
Fisher/Goldwater House, Prescott, Arizona, listed on the NRHP
John P. Fisher House, Portland, Arkansas
William G. Fisher House, Denver, Colorado, listed on the NRHP
Fisher-Zugelder House and Smith Cottage, Gunnison, Colorado
Fisher Homestead (Lewes, Delaware)
Andrew Fisher House, Newark, Delaware
Fisher House (Lavonia, Georgia), listed on the NRHP
Bushnell-Fisher House, Eagle, Idaho
James M. Fisher House, Weiser, Idaho
Fisher-Nash-Griggs House, Ottawa, Illinois
Lewis M. Fisher House, Davenport, Iowa
Fisher Homestead (Cloverport, Kentucky)
Fisher House (Fisherville, Kentucky), listed on the NRHP in Jefferson County
Applegate-Fisher House, West Point, Kentucky
Fisher-Richardson House, Mansfield, Massachusetts
Henry N. Fisher House, Waltham, Massachusetts
Nathan Fisher House, Westborough, Massachusetts
Nelson E. Fisher House – High Banks, Iron River, Michigan
Burr Fisher House, Bozeman, Montana, listed on the NRHP
Fisher House (Kalispell, Montana)
Joseph Fisher House, Stevensville, Montana, listed on the NRHP
E.D. Fisher House, Bolivar, Ohio, listed on the NRHP
Fisher Hall (Oxford, Ohio)
Ferdinand Fisher House, Astoria, Oregon
Raymond and Catherine Fisher House, Portland, Oregon
Thaddeus Fisher House, Portland, Oregon
Fisher House (Hatboro, Pennsylvania)
Maj. Jared B. Fisher House, Spring Mills, Pennsylvania
Adam Fisher Homestead, United, Pennsylvania
Henry Fisher House, Yellow House, Pennsylvania
A.J. Fisher House, Walland, Tennessee
Fisher Hall (San Marcos, Texas), San Marcos, Texas, listed on the NRHP
David Fisher House, Heber City, Utah
Albert Fisher Mansion and Carriage House, Salt Lake City, Utah

See also
Fisher Hall (disambiguation)
Fisher Homestead (disambiguation)

Architectural disambiguation pages